The Roman Catholic Diocese of Patos is a diocese located in the city of Patos in the Ecclesiastical province of Paraíba in Brazil.

History
 January 17, 1959: Established as Diocese of Patos from the Diocese of Cajazeiras and Diocese of Campina Grande

Bishops
 Bishops of Patos (Roman rite)
Expedito Eduardo de Oliveira † (25 February 1959 - 8 May 1983) Died
Gerardo de Andrade Ponte † (5 December 1983 - 8 August 2001) Retired
Manoel dos Reis de Farias (8 August 2001 - 27 July 2011) Appointed, Bishop of Petrolina
Eraldo Bispo da Silva (7 November 2012 – present)

Other priest of this diocese who became bishop
Paulo Jackson Nóbrega de Sousa, appointed	Bishop of Garanhuns, Pernambuco in 2015

References
 GCatholic.org
 Catholic Hierarchy

Roman Catholic dioceses in Brazil
Christian organizations established in 1959
Patos, Roman Catholic Diocese of
Roman Catholic dioceses and prelatures established in the 20th century